Zuleika is a musical with music by Peter Tranchell and book and lyrics by James Ferman.  The musical is based on the 1911 novel, Zuleika Dobson, by Max Beerbohm.

History
The show was first staged at an undergraduate club at Cambridge in 1954, two years before Beerbohm's death. The impresario Donald Albery  acquired the rights to stage it in the West End, and engaged Osbert Lancaster as designer and Alfred Rodrigues as director. The production opened at the Saville Theatre on 11 April 1957.  Beerbohm had died the year before, but his widow, Elisabeth interested herself in the production, and attended the first night.

The plot of the novel was generally followed, except for the conclusion, which was changed to provide a happy ending. Beerbohm had insisted that the name of the heroine should be pronounced "Zuleeka", but for the musical the pronunciation was changed to "Zulika", which was thought easier to sing.

The actress originally cast as Zuleika, Diane Cilento, won excellent critical comment when the show previewed in Manchester, but was taken ill before the show opened in London. She was unable to appear, and the part was taken by Mildred Mayne, a performer best known at the time as a model, appearing on posters in the London Underground advertising underwear.

Cast
Katie Batch – Patricia Stark
Noaks – Peter Woodthorpe
Lord Sayes – Roderick Cook
The Hon Charles Trent-Garby – Clive Exton
Sir John Marraby – Philip Bond
Oover – Michael O'Connor
The Duke of Dorset – David Morton
The Macquern – John Gower
The Warden of Judas – Daniel Thorndyke
Zuleika – Mildred Mayne
Melisande – Hermione Harvey
Aunt Mabel -- Patricia Routledge

Music 
Here is a list of numbers:

 Eights Week
 City of Repose
 Zuleika
 Zuleika's Travels
 Lovely Time
 It's My Doorstep Too!
 All Over Again
 Nellie O'Mora (lyric by Harry Porter)
 Anything Can Happen
 The Last Dance of the Evening
 What Has She Got?
 Always Be Wary of Women
 I Want A Man To Say No
 Someday
 Follow the Fashion
 Seventeen Years From Now

Critical reception 
The Times, having called the show "a most pleasing imitation of Edwardian musical comedy", added "Miss Mildred Mayne, taking the part of Zuleika at short notice, is not, perhaps, all that Beerbohm painted her, but she is always engaging and she sings easily and well." In The Manchester Guardian, Philip Hope-Wallace was unconvinced by the new Zuleika: "What the incomparable Max would have thought of Mildred Mayne, the new leading lady, one fails to imagine." In The Observer, Kenneth Tynan called the show "the best British musical since The Boy Friend", but thought Mayne "competent in a role for which competence is not enough"." Rupert Hart-Davis, who accompanied Elisabeth Beerbohm to the first night, was privately less tactful: he called the show "delightfully gay and charming," but added, "the leading lady is quite without looks, charm or talent. With someone like … Marilyn Monroe it would run for ever."

The show ran for 124 performances, closing on 27 July 1957.

Notes

References

External links
List of British musicals premiering in London in 1957
Peter Tranchell: Musical Works -- Zuleika
PDF of piano selections linked from the above website.

1954 musicals
West End musicals
Musicals based on novels